Alessandro Barchiesi (born 1955) is an Italian classicist. A specialist on Latin poetry, he is best known for his work on Horace, Vergil and Ovid. Having spent the majority of his career in Italy and the United States, he has served as a professor of Classics at New York University since 2016.

Career
Until 1987, Barchiesi was based at the Scuola Normale di Pisa, first as a student of Gian Biagio Conte and later as research fellow. He then became an associate professor at the University of Milan in 1987. In 1990, he was appointed to a tenured position at the University of Verona which he held for ten years. In 2000, Barchiesi moved to a professorship at the University of Siena at Arezzo. He held this position in parallel with a Spogli Professorship at the Stanford University. Since 2016, he works as a professor of Classics at NYU.

In addition to the above appointments, he has had visiting positions at various institutions, including Oxford, Harvard and Princeton. In 2010–11, he served in the prestigious role of Sather Professor of Classical Literature at the University of California, Berkeley.

Selected publications
 Le Fenicie, Venice, 1988. 
 The poet and the prince: Ovid and Augustan discourse, Berkeley, 1997 
 Ovidian transformations: essays on the Metamorphoses and its reception, ed. with P. Hardie and S. Hinds, Cambridge, 1999
 Ovidio: Metamorfosi 1 (Libri I-II), Milan, 2005 
 Ovidio: Metamorfosi 2 (Libri III-IV), Milan, 2007
 Homeric effects in Vergil’s narrative, Princeton, 2015

References

Italian philologists
1955 births
Living people
Italian Latinists
Scuola Normale Superiore di Pisa alumni